Ching-i Tu (born 13 May 1935 in Nanking, China) is an expert on classical Chinese poetry, Chinese intellectual history, Chinese hermeneutics, and cultural changes in modern East Asia. He was a professor and chair of the Department of East Asian Languages and Cultures at Rutgers University and the director of the Confucius Institute of Rutgers University (CIRU). Tu has edited several books and authored several academic papers.

Biography
Tu was born in Nanking, China in 1935. He graduated from National Taiwan University with B.A. in 1958 and received a Ph.D. from the University of Washington in 1967. He married his wife, Sabrina S. Wang, on 14 June 1970. He was a visiting professor at University of Hawaii in Honolulu, from 1971 to 1972, and then at National Taiwan University in Taipei, from 1974 to 1975.

Tu was the first faculty member to teach Chinese language at Rutgers University. He established the Chinese program, and was important in the development of Chinese studies, Asian studies and Asian-American studies at Rutgers. He initiated the introduction of Japanese in the 1980s and was instrumental in the introduction of Korean and Hindi.

Tu also initiated the Rutgers Multi-Media Chinese Teaching System, which received the 2008 World Languages Award from Multimedia Educational Resource for Learning and Online Teaching. Tu is currently the Director of the Confucius Institute at Rutgers.

Selected publications

Author
 Poetic Remarks in the Human World (1970)
 Anthology of Chinese Literature (1972)
 Readings in Chinese Classical Literature (1981)

Editor
 Tradition and Creativity: Essays on East Asian Civilization (Proceedings of the Lecture Series on East Asian Civilization) (1986)
 Classics and Interpretations: The Hermeneutic Traditions in Chinese Culture (2000)
 Interpretation and Intellectual Change: Chinese Hermeneutics in Historical Perspective (2004)

Translator
 Poetic remarks in the human world, Jen Chien Tz'u Hua (1969)

References

External links
 Rutgers University faculty profile

Chinese emigrants to the United States
Living people
University of Washington alumni
Rutgers University faculty
1935 births